Helmuth Kuttelwascher (born 18 March 1940) is an Austrian rower. He competed in the men's coxed four event at the 1960 Summer Olympics. Horst Kuttelwascher, also a rower, is his brother. Together, they won a bronze medal at the inaugural 1962 World Rowing Championships in the coxless four event.

References

1940 births
Living people
Austrian male rowers
Olympic rowers of Austria
Rowers at the 1960 Summer Olympics
Sportspeople from Klagenfurt
World Rowing Championships medalists for Austria